The 403rd Security Division (403. Sicherungs-Division) was a rear-security division in the Wehrmacht of Nazi Germany. Throughout the war, the unit was mainly deployed in the Army Group South Rear Area behind the Eastern Front, which was a large, German-occupied area of the Soviet Union. During the whole war, the 403rd Security Division was used throughout the war mainly on the Eastern Front for security tasks in the rear army area, such as capturing scattered Soviet soldiers and commissars. Further anti-Semitic measures, such as confiscations, removal of functions, the formation of "purely" Jewish houses, followed.

Operational history

Division z.b.V. 403 
The  Division z.b.V. 403, alternatively known as Landesschützen-Division 403, was established on 25 October 1939 in Spandau, which was in the III Military District. It was to consist of ten Territorial Guard (Landesschützen) battalions from the III Military District. August 1940 onwards, the division was part of the 6th Army, which was at the time in Brittany. It was renamed to 403rd Security Division in March 1942.

403rd Security Division

Formation 
The division was formed on 15 March 1941 near Neusalz in Silesia, in the VIII Military District, from the staff of Division z.b.V. 403 and elements of the 213th Infantry Division.

1941 
In 1941, the division fought in the Battle of Moscow and the Battle of Smolensk as part of the Army Group Reserve. During this period, the division was used against the civilian population and burned down numerous villages.

1942 
At the beginning of 1942, the fallback line of the division was broken by the Red Army near Toropets. In the summer of 1942, the division partook in actions against Jews in eastern Ukraine.

1943 
At the beginning of 1943 the division was split into parts, with one part being assigned to the XXIVth Army Corps of the 2nd Panzer Army and the other to the XXXXth Army Corps assigned to the 4th Army. On 31 May 1943 in southern Russia, the division was dissolved.

The division staff moved to Bergen in June 1943 and became the staff of the 265th Infantry Division.

Commanders 
Commanding officers

Further reading 
Organizational History of 371st through 719th German Infantry, Security and Panzer Grenadier Divisions 1939–1945 (PDF; 394 kB), Nafziger Collection, Combined Armed Research Library.
Division z.b.V. 403 / 403. Sicherungs-Division from Ehri project.

References 

Wehrmacht
Military units and formations of the Wehrmacht
Military units and formations of the German Army in World War II